Kief may refer to:

 Kief or cannabis crystals, the resinous trichomes of cannabis.
 Kief, North Dakota, a city in the United States.
 An alternate name for Kyiv (Kiev), the capital of Ukraine.